Kennedy Glacier is located on northwest slopes of Glacier Peak in the U.S. state of Washington. As is true with all the glaciers found on Glacier Peak, Kennedy Glacier is retreating. From about 1850 to 1952, the glacier lost  of its length. During a cooler and wetter period from 1952 to 1984, Kennedy Glacier advanced  but between 1984 and 2005, the glacier again retreated, losing  of its length.

See also
List of glaciers in the United States

References

Glaciers of Glacier Peak
Glaciers of Washington (state)